Bill Shuey (born October 5, 1974) is an American football coach and former defensive back who is the outside linebackers coach for the Jacksonville Jaguars of the National Football League (NFL). He previously served as an assistant coach for the Chicago Bears, Widener Pride, West Chester Golden Rams, and Philadelphia Eagles. 

Shuey played college football at Slippery Rock and spent four seasons in minor leagues with the Pittsburgh Colts and Lehigh Valley Panthers.

Early life and education
Shuey was born on October 5, 1974, in Bethlehem, Pennsylvania, and attended Liberty High School. In high school, he was a wrestler, weighing 103 pounds as a junior and 130 pounds as a senior. Due to his size, Shuey was turned away from football while at Liberty. Following high school he attended West Virginia University for one year, before going to Slippery Rock. He briefly played football at Slippery Rock, and shifted to semi-pro ball after graduating with a degree in sports management.

Playing career
From 1996 to 1999, Shuey played semi-pro football. He spent 1996 with a Pittsburgh team before they folded. Afterwards he returned to Bethlehem but later joined the newly formed Pittsburgh Colts. He spent two seasons with them, and two with the Lehigh Valley Panthers.

Coaching career

Philadelphia Eagles
Following the 1999 season with the Lehigh Valley Panthers, Shuey was given a position with the National Football League (NFL) Philadelphia Eagles as a marketing intern. He returned the following season as an assistant to the training camp coordinator. He would often leave Eagles practice to join the Lehigh Valley Panthers and played with them when the Eagles had preseason scrimmages. In 2001, the Eagles head coach Andy Reid called Shuey and offered him a job. At the time he was a teacher for Pennridge.

Shuey was promoted in 2003 to quality control coach and offensive assistant, where his duties were to compile the playbook, present play diagrams, analyze videotape, and help coach running back reps. His offensive coordinator Brad Childress described him as someone who, "caught everybody's attention with his aptitude for football," and, "an extremely hard worker and a very quick study. Once you tell him something, he gets it." He spent five years in the position, and helped them make the playoffs in three of those years, including one trip to the Super Bowl in 2004. In 2009, he was coach of the Pro Bowl linebackers. He was one of three coaches fired following the 2010 season.

West Chester Golden Rams
After taking a year off in 2011, he was hired by the West Chester Golden Rams in 2012. He spent two seasons as their linebackers coach, helping linebacker Ronell Williams earn defensive player of the year in 2013.

Widener Pride
From 2014 to 2017, he worked with the Widener Pride college football team. He served six different positions there, including assistant head coach, defensive coordinator, co-special teams coordinator, secondary coach, recruiting coordinator, and weight room supervisor.

Chicago Bears
In , he was promoted again to outside linebackers coach. The Bears outside linebackers include Khalil Mack, a six-time Pro Bowler. He was not retained following the firing of head coach Matt Nagy and the subsequent hiring of Matt Eberflus after the conclusion of the 2021 season.

Jacksonville Jaguars
On February 17, 2022, Shuey was hired by the Jacksonville Jaguars as their outside linebackers coach under head coach Doug Pederson.

References

External links
Jacksonville Jaguars profile

1974 births
Living people
Liberty High School (Bethlehem, Pennsylvania) alumni
American football defensive backs
Chicago Bears coaches
Coaches of American football from Pennsylvania
Jacksonville Jaguars coaches
Philadelphia Eagles coaches
Players of American football from Pennsylvania
Slippery Rock football players
Sportspeople from Bethlehem, Pennsylvania
West Chester Golden Rams football coaches
Widener Pride football coaches